Red Sea University (Jām'ah al-Baḥr al-aḥmar) is located in the city of Port Sudan, in the state of The Red Sea in eastern Sudan. It was established in 1994.
It is a member of the Federation of the Universities of the Islamic World.

There are eight schools within the university: Marine Science and Fisheries, Engineering, Economic school, Education, Medicine, Science and Earth Science.

History
The Red Sea University was established in the year 1994 AD according to Republican Decree No. (67), according to which the University of the East was divided into three universities: Kassala University, Gedaref University, and Red Sea University.

Red Sea University began its journey as an independent university with three faculties, namely the College of Marine Sciences, the College of Engineering and the College of Earth Sciences, and it was not long before that until the School of Maritime Transport was established, which was transferred to the College of Economics and Administrative Sciences in the year 1995 AD, and maritime transport studies became one of its other departments.  .

In the year 1994 AD, a republican decree was issued to transform all the institutes and colleges of teacher preparation affiliated with the Ministry of Education spread throughout Sudan into colleges of education and affiliated with universities. According to this decree, the Institute of Teachers’ Preparation in Port Sudan was transferred to the College of Education and was designated for graduating basic stage teachers, after which it was established  The College of Education in Jabet City to graduate secondary school teachers in the year 1998 AD.

The university witnessed a leap in the number of colleges in 1998, when the College of Medicine and Health Sciences was established for the purpose of providing qualified doctors and medical staff, and the same year witnessed the establishment of the College of Applied Sciences, and the aim of its establishment was dictated by the presence of a number of colleges of a scientific nature in addition to the accompanying expansion in structures  This is in addition to rehabilitating human cadres and manpower, attracting faculty members and teaching assistants, and sending them for training.  The Red Sea University continued to do more to give and provide service to the community. This educational service included other sectors of society with different conditions and needs that were achieved by conducting additional and continuing studies in 1995.  Several study programs qualifying for intermediate and technical diplomas have been implemented in the disciplines of education, economics, engineering, earth sciences and applied sciences. Large numbers of students have graduated from these diplomas, in addition to studying by affiliation to obtain a bachelor's degree from the Faculty of Economics. Due to the expansion of additional studies and the success they have achieved, they have been transferred to  A stand-alone college under the name of College of Technical Studies.

The university established a unit for postgraduate studies in the year 1996 AD, and the first batch of higher education diplomas was registered, followed by registration for a master's degree in the faculties of education, marine sciences, economics and applied sciences, with the research system only. In the year 2004 AD, the Deanship of Postgraduate Studies and Scientific Research was established and an equipped building was allocated  To be the seat of postgraduate studies.

In 2007, the College of Arts and Humanities was established, bringing the number of university faculties in 2007 to nine faculties and a Deanship of Postgraduate Studies. The university shifted from the stage of foundation in the infrastructure to the stage of refining the educational process to raise it qualitatively and quantitatively to the ranks of advanced universities. In this context, attention was paid to the faculty and teaching assistants.  Attracting them and sending them for training.[1]

Schools and colleges

 College of Earth Sciences
 College of Marine Sciences
 College of Engineering
 College of Earth Sciences
 Faculty of Economics and Administrative Sciences
 Faculty of Education
 College of Medicine and Health Sciences
 Faculty of Applied Science
 College of Technical Studies
 Faculty of Arts and Humanities
 Faculty of Dentistry
 faculty of Agriculture
 School of Law

Accreditation

References

Universities and colleges in Sudan
Port Sudan
Educational institutions established in 1994
1994 establishments in Sudan